Sergio Ayala López (born 19 March 1993) is a Spanish footballer who plays as a centre-back for San Fernando CD.

Club career 
Born in Sant Feliu de Llobregat, Barcelona, Catalonia, Ayala joined FC Barcelona's youth academy at the age of 7 in 2000. After being an undisputed starter of the Juvenil A during the 2011–12 season, he was promoted to the B-team on 18 June 2012, and signed a contract till 2015.

On 21 August 2012, Ayala joined Deportivo Alavés on loan for the 2012–13 season. On 21 August 2013, he moved to Valencia Mestalla on loan. After featuring 33 times for the side, he signed permanently with the club on 14 July 2014. On 20 September 2015, he scored his first goal for the club in a 2–3 defeat against UE Cornellà.

On 25 July 2017, Ayala moved abroad for the first time, signing for Belgian club Sint-Truidense V.V. on a one-year contract. On 13 July 2018, he returned to Spain and joined FC Cartagena for the upcoming season.

References

External links

1993 births
Living people
Association football defenders
Spanish footballers
Segunda División B players
FC Barcelona Atlètic players
Deportivo Alavés players
Valencia CF Mestalla footballers
FC Cartagena footballers
Salamanca CF UDS players
Sint-Truidense V.V. players
Spain youth international footballers
Spanish expatriate footballers
Expatriate footballers in Belgium
Spanish expatriate sportspeople in Belgium